"White Privilege: Unpacking the Invisible Knapsack" is a 1989 essay written by American feminist scholar and anti-racist activist Peggy McIntosh. It covers 50 examples, or hidden benefits, from McIntosh's perspective, of the privilege white people experience in everyday life.

Themes 
"Invisible" factors. McIntosh's outlines "invisible systems" at work, as well as the main theme of an "invisible package of unearned assets", examined in the form of a metaphorical knapsack.
The essay features 50 of McIntosh's insights into experiential white privilege, listed numerically. These have been described as "small benefits that white Americans enjoy every day."

Reception
The Atlantic has written that the intention behind the essay was to inspire "self-reflection, enhancing their capacity for empathy and compassion." It has been described by Vice as one of the most authoritative texts on the subject of white privilege, and The Harvard Gazette have called it a "groundbreaking article" and the most important of McIntosh's academic career. It has been cited as responsible for the mainstreaming of discussion of white privilege, becoming a "staple of discussions about bias" in society. In 2018, artwork and studies inspired by the essay had become popular in social justice sections of social media, such as Tumblr.

Influence on education 
The essay has become one of the key teaching resources in the study of white privilege in North America. In 2016, some New York City public schools assigned the reading to high school students. In 2017, a high school in Caledon, Ontario discussed the essay as part of an 11th Grade anthropology class. Conor Friedersdorf has recommended the essay's inclusion in college curriculums. The essay has inspired "Privilege Walks", workshops, and similar activities to help students concretely identify their privileges, though McIntosh herself has disavowed the walks as "too simple for complex experiences relating to power and privilege" and thus as "counterproductive".

References

External links 
 

1989 essays
White privilege
Works about White Americans
Works about white people